"Marina" is a 1959 Italian song by Italian-Belgian singer-songwriter Rocco Granata, his first international hit and best known song. Originally released in 1959 as the B-side of "Manuela", the B-side became more played than the A-side, and by 30 January "Marina" interrupted "Oh! Carol" by Neil Sedaka for one week at the No.1 spot of Hitkrant's List of European number-one hits of 1960. The song sold millions of copies.
It was #1 in Belgium, #31 in the US, and #1 in Germany, The Netherlands, Italy and Norway. 
It was the #2 jukebox play of the whole year in Automaten-Markt's records after "Seemann" by Lolita.

Trivia 

The song "Marina" was so popular in Belgium and the Netherlands that many parents named their baby daughters Marina. In the Netherlands, the number of born Marina's rose from 156 in 1958 (before the hit song), to 190 and 250 in 1959 and 1960: an increase of 22% in 1959 and again 32% the next year.

A (German) musical feature film entitled Marina (by Paul Martin) was released in 1960.

In 1989, Granata commissioned a dance remix of "Marina" (by Rocco Granata & The Carnations), which again topped the Belgian charts as well as those of Italy and Germany.

In 2013 his early life (and his musical career starting with the sudden success of the hit "Marina") was captured in a new biographical movie named Marina, directed by Stijn Coninx.

References

Belgian pop songs
1959 singles
1959 songs
Italian-language Belgian songs